The 1947–48 Syracuse Nationals season was the second season of the franchise in the National Basketball League.

Roster

Regular season

Eastern Division standings

Western Division standings

Playoffs
Lost Opening Round (Anderson Packers) 3–0

References

Philadelphia 76ers seasons
Syracuse